Philippa Dowding is a Canadian writer of children's literature, whose novel Firefly was the winner of the Governor General's Award for English-language children's literature at the 2021 Governor General's Awards.

She has also been a four-time nominee for Forest of Reading's Silver Birch Awards, receiving nods in 2017 for Myles and the Monster Outside and in 2020 for Oculum.

Works
Oculum (2018)
Firefly (2021)

Weird Stories Gone Wrong series
Jake and the Giant Hand (2014)
Myles and the Monster Outside (2015)
Carter and the Curious Maze (2016)
Alex and the Other (2018)
Blackwells and the Briny Deep (2018)
Quinn and the Quiet, Quiet (2019)

Nightflyers Handbook series
The Strange Gift of Gwendolyn Golden (2014)
Everton Miles is Stranger than Me (2016)

References

External links

21st-century Canadian novelists
21st-century Canadian women writers
Canadian women novelists
Canadian women children's writers
Governor General's Award-winning children's writers
Writers from Toronto
Living people
Year of birth missing (living people)